Peets is a surname. Notable people with the surname include:

Brian Peets (born 1956), American football player
Elbert Peets (1886–1968), American architect, city planner, and author
Ülo Peets (born 1944), Estonian politician
William Peets (born 1952), U.S. Virgin Islands boxer

See also
Peet (disambiguation)